Garnett Brown (January 31, 1936 – October 9, 2021) was a jazz trombonist who worked with The Crusaders, Herbie Hancock, Lionel Hampton, Earth Wind and Fire and others.

Born in Memphis, Tennessee, he graduated from the University of Arkansas at Pine Bluff and later studied film scoring and electronic music at UCLA. In 1974 he won the Down Beat Reader's poll for trombonist, and appears on the classic 1976 recording Bobby Bland and B.B. King Together Again...Live.

He did some work in film and television composition due to his training in the field. In 1989 he was the conductor and orchestrator for Harlem Nights.

Coincident with Kenny Burrell joining UCLA as Director of Jazz Studies in 1996, Brown co-led UCLA Jazz Ensemble I with John Clayton. 

Married Anna Brown with two children Ariana Brown and Miranda Brown-Muir and three grandchildren Luca Muir, Francesca Muir and Alessandra Muir. At the time of his death, he was retired and had been diagnosed with dementia.

Discography

As sideman
1962: Drumfusion - Chico Hamilton
1964: Nirvana - Charles Lloyd
1965: Slightly Latin - Roland Kirk
1965 Hold On, I'm Coming - Art Blakey
1965: Honeybuns - Duke Pearson
1966: Heavy!!! - Booker Ervin
1966: Flute By-Laws - Hubert Laws
1967: Lush Life - Lou Donaldson
1967: The Return of the Prodigal Son - Stanley Turrentine
1967: Introducing Duke Pearson's Big Band - Duke Pearson
1967: It's All Right! - Teddy Edwards
1968: Easterly Winds - Jack Wilson
1968: Manhattan Fever - Frank Foster
1968: Now Hear This - Duke Pearson
1968: Plug Me In - Eddie Harris
1968: Goodies - George Benson
1969: Crying Song - Hubert Laws
1969: The Prisoner - Herbie Hancock
1970: MCMLXX - Ray Bryant - guest on 1 track 
1970: Music Inc.- Charles Tolliver
1970: 3 Shades of Blue - Johnny Hodges
1970: Houston Express - Houston Person 
1970: Louis Armstrong and His Friends − Louis Armstrong
1971: My Way - Gene Ammons
1971: Plastic Dreams - Modern Jazz Quartet
1971: Blues in Orbit - Gil Evans
1971: What's Going On - Johnny "Hammond" Smith
1972: The London Muddy Waters Sessions - Muddy Waters
1972: Blue Moses - Randy Weston
1972: Joy of Cookin' - Joe Thomas
1972: Soul Is... Pretty Purdie - Bernard Purdie
1972: Time & Love - Jackie and Roy
1972: Free - Airto Moreira
1972: Sweet Revival - Ronnie Foster
1972: Morning Star - Hubert Laws
1973: I Want a Country Man - Dakota Staton
1973: The Cisco Kid - Reuben Wilson
1973: Night Glider- Groove Holmes
1973: Part of the Search - Yusef Lateef
1973: Charles III - Charles Earland
1973: Giant Box - Don Sebesky
1973: Sassy Soul Strut - Lou Donaldson
1973: Today's Man - Charles McPherson
1974: The Almoravid - Joe Chambers
1974: 10 Years Hence - Yusef Lateef
1974: The Fourth Dimension - Jack McDuff
1974: Big Bad Bo - Bo Diddley
1974: Until It's Time for You to Go - Rusty Bryant 
1974: Another Beginning - Les McCann
1974: Crosswinds - Billy Cobham
1974: Journey – Arif Mardin (Atlantic)
1975: Man-Child - Herbie Hancock
1975: Brass Fever  - Brass Fever
1975: Impact - Charles Tolliver
1975: Six Million Dollar Man - Richard "Groove" Holmes
1976: Time Is Running Out - Brass Fever
1976: How Can You Live Like That? - Eddie Harris
1976: Bobby Bland and B.B. King Together Again...Live
1976: Silver 'n Wood - Horace Silver
1979: Street Life - The Crusaders
1980: Night Song - Ahmad Jamal
1981: Lomelin - Gerald Wilson Orchestra of the 80's (Discovery)
1982: Jessica - Gerald Wilson's Orchestra of the 80's (Trend)
1984: Calafia - Gerald Wilson's Orchestra of the 80's (Trend)

As session player

1974  Continental American - Peter Allen

References

1936 births
2021 deaths
Musicians from Memphis, Tennessee
American jazz trombonists
Male trombonists
University of Arkansas at Pine Bluff alumni
Jazz musicians from Tennessee
21st-century trombonists
21st-century American male musicians
American male jazz musicians
The Capp-Pierce Juggernaut members
Brass Fever members